Yuka Ebihara (Japanese: 海老原由佳, Ebihara Yuka; born 22 October 1986 in Tokyo, Japan) is a Japanese ballet dancer. Since September 2011, she has been engaged with Warsaw’s Teatr Wielki. Since September 2013, she became a first soloist, and since January 2020 she is a principal dancer of the Polish National Ballet.

Artistic career

Beginnings 
Ebihara took up dancing as a 7-year-old in Beijing, where she lived with her family as her father had a temporary working contract. Since 1997, she had continued her training in Iwata Ballet School in Yokohama, and then 2005 in Goh Ballet Academy in Vancouver, Canada. After finishing her training in 2008, she became a soloist of Goh Ballet Youth Company. After one year of dancing with the company, she started to seek her place elsewhere. She was engaged with Norwegian National Ballet, Oslo (2008–2009), performed as a guest dancer with the company of Vienna Festival Ballet in Great Britain (2008), was a soloist with French Compagnie Mezzo Ballet (2009), and danced with the Suzanne Farrell Ballet, USA (2009). Then, for two years (2009–2011), she was engaged as a soloist of Croatian National Theatre, Zagreb, where she discovered the Polish National Ballet – a newly created company in Warsaw's Teatr Wielki under the direction of Krzysztof Pastor – was looking for dancers.

In Poland 
In 2011, Ebihara went through audition to Polish National Ballet, and she got a contract. She began as a corps de ballet dancer, but in only 2 years she was promoted twice and in 2013 she became a first soloist, which is the highest rank in the company’s structure. In a very short time, she took over many roles in the company’s repertoire and begin to represent Polish National Ballet on international ballet galas in USA, Russia, Japan, Spain, Netherlands, Sweden, Norway, Germany, Czech, Lithuania and Latvia.

Major achievements

Overseas 
 Giselle – Giselle by Choo-San Goh (Goh Ballet Youth Company)
 Sugar Plum Fairy – The Nutcracker by Choo-San Goh (Goh Ballet Youth Company)
 Soloist – Grand pas classique by Victor Gsovsky (Goh Ballet Youth Company)
 Odette-Odile – Swan Lake by Marius Petipa and Lev Ivanov (Vienna Festival Ballet)
 Swanilda – Coppélia by Christopher Lee Wright (Vienna Festival Ballet)
 Fairy of the Courage – The Sleeping Beauty by Emily Hufton (Vienna Festival Ballet)
 Duet – Dark Lines / Red Softness by Yannis Chevalier (Compagnie Mezzo Ballet)
 Kitri and Queen of Dryads – Don Quixote by Patrick Armand (Croatian National Theatre, Zagreb)
 Soloist and Duet – Concerto Barocco by George Balanchine (Croatian National Theatre, Zagreb)
 Princess Aurora – The Sleeping Beauty by Derek Dean (Croatian National Theatre, Zagreb)
 Main couple – Paquita by Derek Dean (Croatian National Theatre, Zagreb)
 Sugar Plum Fairy – The Nutcracker by Vaslav Orlikowsky (Croatian National Theatre, Zagreb)

With Polish National Ballet 
 Gamzatti and Nikija – La Bayadère by Natalia Makarova
 Our-Strong Woman and Our-Other Girl – And the Rain Will Pass… by Krzysztof Pastor
 Principal Classic Seraphim – Six Wings of Angels by Jacek Przybyłowicz
 Fairy Autumn and Fairy Spring – Cinderella by Frederick Ashton
 Princess Florine – The Sleeping Beauty by Yury Grigorovich
 Duet 3 – Century Rolls by Ashley Page
 Duet 2 – Artifact Suite by William Forsythe
 Duet 2 i 1 – Moving Rooms by Krzysztof Pastor
 Clara – The Nutcracker and the Mouse King by Toer van Schayk & Wayne Eagling
 Siren – The Prodigal Son by George Balanchine
 Hippolyta-Titania – A Midsummer Night’s Dream by John Neumeier
 Osilde – Tristan by Krzysztof Pastor
 First Soloist and Duet – Concerto Barocco by George Balanchine
 First Aria – In Light and Shadow by Krzysztof Pastor
 Duet – The Kisses by Emil Wesołowski
 Duet 2 – Adagio & Scherzo by Krzysztof Pastor
 Kitri-Dulcinea, Street Dancer and Queen of the Dryads – Don Quixote by Alexei Fadeyechev
 Julia – Romeo and Juliet by Krzysztof Pastor
 Mlle Gattai – Casanova in Warsaw by Krzysztof Pastor
 Katherina – The Taming of the Shrew by John Cranko
 Miranda – The Tempest by Krzysztof Pastor
 Soloist & Duet – Chopiniana by Mikhail Fokine
 Soloist – Chroma by Wayne McGregor
 Main Soloist – Bolero by Krzysztof Pastor
 Mathilde Kschessinska – Swan Lake by Krzysztof Pastor (with new libretto)
 Princess Alix-Odette – Swan Lake by Krzysztof Pastor (with new libretto)
 Świtezianka – Świtezianka by Robert Bondara 
 Flute – On a Stave (Tansman's Sextuor) by Jacek Tyski
 Soloist – Szymanowski's Violin Concerto No. 2 by Jacek Przybyłowicz
 Marguerite Gautier – The Lady of the Camellias by John Neumeier
 Our Couple – And the Rain Will Pass… by Krzysztof Pastor
 Soloist – Chopins Concerto in E minor by Liam Scarlett
 The Reborn – Chopins Concerto in F minor by Krzysztof Pastor
 Princess Aurora – The Sleeping Beauty by Yury Grigorovitch
 Soloist – Infra by Wayne McGregor
 Médora – Le Corsaire by Manuel Legris
Countess Marie Larisch – Mayerling by Kenneth MacMillan
Mary Vetsera – Mayerling by Kenneth MacMillan
Galina – Flights-Harnasie by Izadora Weiss
Mina-Elisabeth - Dracula by Krzysztof Pastor

Awards 
 2003: First Prize & Scholarship, Ballet Competition, Yokohama, Japan
 2006: First Prize & Scholarship, Surrey Festival of Dance, Surrey, Canada
 2006: Senior Ballet Championships Winner & Most Outstanding Dance Award, British Columbia Provincials, Vancouver, Kanada
 2010: Gold Medal (category 22-28 years), International Competition of Ballet Dancers Mia Čorak Slavenska, Zagreb, Croatia
 2014: Jan Kiepura Theatre Music Award for the best dancer in Poland
 2017: Jan Kiepura Theatre Music Award for the best classical dancer in Poland
 2019: Silver Medal for Merit to Culture ‘Gloria Artis’ in Poland

Bibliography 
 http://teatrwielki.pl/ludzie/yuka-ebihara/
 http://www.taniecpolska.pl/people/387
 http://www.encyklopediateatru.pl/osoby/71357/yuka-ebihara
 http://www.gala.pl/artykul/yuka-ebihara-wlasciwie-nie-wiem-gdzie-jest-moj-dom-170616011028

References 

Japanese ballerinas
1986 births
Living people
Principal dancers